Saaku Magalu is a 1963 Kannada language romantic drama film directed and produced by B. R. Panthulu and starring Rajkumar and Sowcar Janaki. The film marked the entry of acclaimed actress Kalpana, who went on to become one of the most sought-after actresses in Kannada cinema.

Director Panthulu selected Kalpana based on the recommendation of co-artist Narasimharaju and his assistant Puttanna Kanagal. 
Panthulu made the movie simultaneously in Telugu as Pempudu Koothuru, starring NTR, Devika and Sowcar Janaki.

Cast
 Rajkumar as Raghuram
 Sowcar Janaki as Manjula
 Rajashankar as Vasu, Manjula's brother
 Kalpana as Uma, Raghuram's foster sister
 Dikki Madhava Rao as Raghuram and Uma's father
 Narasimharaju
 Balakrishna as Dashavatharam
 Ramadevi
 M. N. Lakshmi Devi
 Shivaji Rao
 H. Krishna Shastry

Crew
 Producer: B. R. Panthulu
 Production Company: Padmini Pictures
 Director: B. R. Panthulu
 Music: T. G. Lingappa
 Lyrics: Kanagal Prabhakara Shastry
 Story: Eera Shanmugham
 Screenplay: Chithra Krishnasamy
 Dialogues: G. V. Iyer
 Art Direction: Selvaraj
 Editing: R. Devarajan
 Choreography: P. S. Gopala Krishna
 Cinematography: V. Ramamurthy

Soundtrack
The music director of the movie T. G. Lingappa himself rendered the hummings for 2 songs - Naanu Andhalaade and Jeevanaraga - the former of which had its picturization on the lead who acts to be a dumb person.

 "Kelida Maathe" - Ghantasala
 "Onde Ondu Hosa Haadu" - S. Janaki, P. B. Sreenivas
 "Jeevana Raga" - Ghantasala, S. Janaki
 "Naanu Andhalade" - P. Susheela
 "Baa Bega Manamohana" - P. Leela
 "Elli Hombelakelli" - Ghantasala
 "Naanu Andhalade" - P. Susheela, T. G. Lingappa

References

External links
 Saaku Magalu on Chiloka
 
 

1963 films
Indian drama films
1960s Kannada-language films
Indian black-and-white films
Indian multilingual films
Films scored by T. G. Lingappa
Films directed by B. R. Panthulu
1963 drama films
1960s multilingual films